Come Over to My Place is the second single by Davina, released from her debut album, Best of Both Worlds in 1998. The single peaked at eighty-one on Billboard Hot 100.

Background
Come Over to My Place was written and produced by Davina.

Chart positions

References

American contemporary R&B songs
1998 songs
Loud Records singles
Neo soul songs